Jupadu Bunglow is a village and a Mandal in Nandyal district in the state of Andhra Pradesh in India.

Geography
11 villages are currently under this Mandal.

References 

Villages in Nandyal district